Heinrich Hoffmann (born 20 February 1869, date of death unknown) was a German sport shooter who competed in the 1912 Summer Olympics. In 1912 he was a member of the German team which finished seventh in the 30 metre team military pistol competition. In the 50 metre pistol event he finished 54th.

References

External links
List of German sport shooters

1869 births
Year of death missing
German male sport shooters
ISSF pistol shooters
Olympic shooters of Germany
Shooters at the 1912 Summer Olympics